Honiton Town Football Club is a football club based in Honiton, Devon, England.

History
Honiton Town were members of the Devon & Exeter League during the 1980s and 1990s, until withdrawing in 1997–98. On rejoining the league, they stayed in the lower divisions until they won Division One in 2014–15. They won the Premier Division in 2016–17 and were promoted to the South West Peninsula League Division One East. At the end of 2018–19 the league was restructured, and Honiton successfully applied for promotion to the Premier Division East, at Step 6 of the National League System.

Honours
Devon & Exeter League
Premier Division champions 2016–17

References

External links
Official website

Association football clubs established in 1950
1950 establishments in England
Football clubs in England
Football clubs in Devon
Devon and Exeter Football League
South West Peninsula League